The United Nations General Assembly Resolution 2065 was a non-binding resolution adopted on 16 December 1965 that recognized the existence of a sovereignty dispute between the United Kingdom and Argentina over the Falkland Islands. The resolution invites the parties to find a peaceful solution to the dispute.

References

United Nations General Assembly resolutions
Falkland Islands sovereignty dispute
1965 in the United Nations
December 1965 events
United Kingdom and the United Nations
Argentina and the United Nations